This is a list of English association football (soccer) families.

Families included on the list must have
 at least, one member of the family is capped by a national team on the senior level or an important person in the game of football (e.g., notable coaches, referees, club chairmen, etc.)
 a second member must be a professional player or capped by a national team on the U-17 level or above.

List

A
 Fisayo Adarabioyo, Tosin Adarabioyo (brother)
 John Alexander, Trent Alexander-Arnold (nephew)
 Sam Allardyce, Craig Allardyce (son) 
 Les Allen, Dennis Allen (brother), Clive Allen (son), Paul Allen (nephew), Martin Allen (nephew/Dennis's son), Bradley Allen (son), Oliver Allen (grandson/Clive's son), Charlie Allen (grand nephew/Martin's son)
 Eniola Aluko,  Sone Aluko (brother)
 Viv Anderson, Del Sharpe (cousin), Malachi Sharpe (first cousin of Viv & son of Del), Malika Sharpe (first cousin of Viv, Daughter of Del & sister of Malachi)
 John Aston Sr., John Aston Jr. (son)

B
 Roy Bailey, Gary Bailey (son)
  Gerry Baker, Joe Baker (brother)
 Sam Baldock,  George Baldock (brother)
 Alan Ball, Sr., Alan Ball, Jr. (son)
 Arthur Bambridge, Charles Bambridge (brother), Ernest Bambridge (brother)
 Jeff Barmby, Nick Barmby (son), Jack Barmby (son of Nick)
 Bobby Barnes,  Giles Barnes (nephew), Marcus Barnes (nephew/Giles' brother) 
 Jim Barrett, Sr., Jim Barrett, Jr. (son)
 Gareth Barry, Bradley Barry (nephew)
  Bobby Baxter Sr., Bobby Baxter Jr. (son)
 Dave Beasant, Sam Beasant (son)
 Jude Bellingham, Jobe Bellingham (brother)
 Junior Bent, Darren Bent (nephew), Cory Bent (son) 
 Arthur Blackburn, Fred Blackburn (brother)
 John Bond, Kevin Bond (son)
 Ian Bowyer, Gary Bowyer (son)
   Peter Boyle, Tommy Boyle (son)
  James Brandon,  Tom Brandon (brother),  Harry Brandon (cousin), Tom Brandon Jr (nephew/son of Tom)
 Ken Brown, Kenny Brown (son)
 Wes Brown, Clive Brown, Reece Brown (brothers)
 Steve Bruce,  Alex Bruce (son)
  Matt Busby, Don Gibson (son-in-law)
 Terry Butcher,  Pat Nevin (cousin)

C
 Kevin Campbell, Tyrese Campbell (son)
 Jamie Carragher, James Carragher (son)
 Neville Chamberlain, Mark Chamberlain (brother), Alex Oxlade-Chamberlain (nephew/son of Mark), Christian Oxlade-Chamberlain (brother of Alex)
 Thomas Chapman, Herbert Chapman, Matt Chapman, Harry Chapman (brothers), Harry Chapman Jr. (nephew/son of Harry)
 John Charles, Clive Charles (brother)
 Charlton :see Milburn
 Allan Clarke, Frank Clarke, Derek Clarke, Kelvin Clarke, Wayne Clarke (brothers)
 Ken Clayton, Ronnie Clayton (brother)
 Charles Clegg, William Clegg (brother)
 Dave Clement, Neil Clement, Paul Clement (sons)
 Brian Clough, Nigel Clough (son)
 Andy Cole, Devante Cole (son)
 Anthony Cook,  Reice Charles-Cook,  Regan Charles-Cook (brothers)
 Kenny Cooper Sr.,  Kenny Cooper Jr. (son)
 Terry Cooper, Mark Cooper (son), Charlie Cooper (grandson/son of Mark)
 Pauline Cope, Keith Boanas (husband)
 Alan Cork, Jack Cork (son)
 Peter Croker, Ted Croker (brother), Eric Dier (grand nephew/Ted's grandson)

D
 Kevin Davies, Jamie Jackson (half-brother)
 Andy Dawson, Kevin Dawson (brother), Michael Dawson (brother)
 Jermain Defoe,  Ryan Edgar (cousin), Anthony Edgar (cousin/brother of Ryan)
Rory Delap, Liam Delap (son)
 Nigel Doughty,  Michael Doughty (son), Patrick Bamford (godson)
 Bob Dowie,  Iain Dowie (brother), Natasha Dowie (daughter of Bob), Becky Easton (wife of Natasha)

F
 Justin Fashanu, John Fashanu (brother)
 Billy Fairhurst, David Fairhurst (brother)
  Bob Ferrier Sr., Bob Ferrier Jr. (son)
 William Foulke, Jim Simmons (nephew)
 Ted Fenton, Benny Fenton (brother)
 Les Ferdinand, Rio Ferdinand (cousin), Anton Ferdinand (cousin/Rio's brother),  Kane Ferdinand (cousin)
 Fred Forman, Frank Forman (brother), Harry Linacre (nephew)
 Frank Froggatt, Jack Froggatt (nephew), Redfern Froggatt (son)

G
 Dan Gallagher, Conor Gallagher (brothers)
 Tommy Gardner,  Hannah Keryakoplis (great-granddaughter)
 Billy Garraty, Jack Grealish (2nd great grandson)
 Steven Gerrard,  Anthony Gerrard (cousin), Bobby Duncan (cousin)
 Steve Gibson, Ben Gibson (nephew)
 Kevin Glendon, George Glendon (son)
 John Goodall,  Archie Goodall (brother)
  Lewis Goram,  Andy Goram  (son)
 Bobby Gould,  Jonathan Gould, Richard Gould (sons),  Matthew Gould (grandson, son of Jonathan)
 Jack Gregory, John Gregory (son)
 Jimmy Greaves, Danny Greaves (son)
 Jimmy Greenhoff, Brian Greenhoff (brother)
  Bryan Gunn, Angus Gunn (son)

H
 Colin Harvey, Brian Harvey (brother)
 Tony Hateley, Mark Hateley (son), Danielle Hill (granddaughter),  Tom Hateley (grandson/Mark's son)
  Sandy Herd,  Alec Herd (brother), David Herd (nephew - son of Alec)
 Hubert Heron, Francis Heron (brother)
 David Hirst, George Hirst (son)
 Glenn Hoddle, Carl Hoddle (brother)
 Steve Hodge, Elliot Hodge (son)
 Liam Hogan,  Scott Hogan (brother) 
 Eric Houghton, Roy Houghton (brother), Reg Goodacre (cousin), Chris Woods (great-nephew)
 Steph Houghton, Stephen Darby (husband)
 Lee Howey, Steve Howey (brother)
 Charlie Hurst, Geoff Hurst (son)

I
 Paul Ince, Tom Ince (son),  Clayton Ince (Paul's second cousin) Rohan Ince (Paul's third cousin),  Erick Young (Rohan's Uncle)

J
  Bob Jack, David Jack (son),  Rollo Jack (son)
  Jimmy Jackson, James Jackson (son), Archie Jackson (son)
 Steve Jagielka, Phil Jagielka (brother) 
 Reece James, Lauren James (sister) 
  David Johnson,  Brennan Johnson (son)
 Gary Johnson, Lee Johnson (son)
 Harry Johnson Snr., Harry Johnson Jr. (son), Tom Johnson (son)

K
 Michael Keane,  Will Keane (twins)
 Martin Keown,  Niall Keown (son)
 Cyril Knowles, Peter Knowles (brother)

L
 Dave Latchford, Bob Latchford (brother), Peter Latchford (brother)
 Rob Lee, Olly Lee (son), Elliot Lee (son)
 Aaron Lescott, Joleon Lescott (brother)
 Harry Lilley, Will Lilley (brother)
 Jesse Lingard, Gabrielle George (cousin)
 Kelvin Lomax, Kieran Trippier (brother)
 Longstaff: see Thompson

M
 Ray Mabbutt, Kevin Mabbutt (son), Gary Mabbutt (son)
 Harry Maguire, Laurence Maguire (brother)
 Gordon Marshall Sr.,   Gordon Marshall Jr. (son),  Scott Marshall (son)
 Alvin Martin, David Martin (son), Joe Martin (son)
 Brian Marwood, James Marwood (son)
  Andy McCall,  Stuart McCall (son)
 Don Megson, Gary Megson (son),  Neil Megson (son)
 Jack Milburn, George Milburn (brother), Jim Milburn (brother), Jackie Milburn (cousin), Stanley Milburn (brother), Jack Charlton (nephew), Bobby Charlton (nephew) 
 Percy Mills, Nigel Pearson (grandson), James Pearson (son of Nigel)
  Jimmy Milne, Gordon Milne (son)
 Thomas Mort,  Enoch Mort (cousin)

N
 Gary Neville, Phil Neville (brother),  Harvey Neville (Phil's son, Gary's nephew)
 Gifton Noel-Williams,  Dejon Noel-Williams
 Keith Nobbs, Jordan Nobbs (daughter)

O
 Afolabi Obafemi,  Michael Obafemi (brother)
 Terry Owen, Michael Owen (son),  Richie Partridge (Terry's son-in-law; Michael's brother-in-law)
 Cyril Oxley, Bernard Oxley (brother)

P
 Louis Page, Jack Page (brother), Tom Page (brother), Willie Page (brother)
 Glyn Pardoe, Mike Doyle (co-father in law), Tommy Doyle (grandson of Pardoe and Doyle)
 Jack Parry, Ray Parry (brother), Cyril Parry (brother)
 Hubert Pearson, Harold Pearson (son), Harry Hibbs (Harold's cousin), Horace Pearson (also Harold's cousin)
 Syd Puddefoot, Len Puddefoot (brother)

R
 Herbert Rawson, William Rawson (brother)
 Harry Redknapp, Frank Lampard, Sr. (brother in law), Jamie Redknapp (son), Frank Lampard (nephew in law/Frank's son)
 Cyrille Regis, Dave Regis (cousin),  Otis Roberts (cousin),  Jason Roberts (nephew)
 Andy Rhodes, Steve Agnew (brother-in-law),  Jordan Rhodes (son)
 Kieran Richardson, Jordan Brown (cousin)
  Bruce Rioch, Neil Rioch (brother), Gregor Rioch (son), Matty Holmes (nephew)
 Tony Rodwell, Jack Rodwell (nephew) 
 Wayne Rooney, John Rooney (brother), Tommy Rooney (cousin), Jake Rooney (cousin)
 Danny Rose, Mitch Rose (brother)
 Jimmy Ruffell, Bill Ruffell (brother)

S
 John Salako,  Andy Salako (brother)
 Tommy Sampy, Bill Sampy (brother)
 Kenny Sansom, Dave Sansom (brother)
 Roy Saunders,  Dean Saunders (son)
 Tony Sealy,  Jack Sealy (son)
 Teddy Sheringham, Charlie Sheringham (son)
 Peter Shilton, Sam Shilton (son)
 Guy Shuttleworth, Ben Chilwell (grandson)
 Martin Sinclair, Scott Sinclair (brother), Jake Sinclair (brother)
 Jack Smith, Tom Smith (brother), Billy Smith (brother), Joe Smith (brother), Sep Smith (brother)
 Lewwis Spence,  Drew Spence (sister)
 Brian Stein, Mark Stein (brother), Ed Stein (brother)
 Dennis Stevens, Duncan Edwards (cousin)
 Simon Sturridge, Dean Sturridge (brother), Daniel Sturridge (nephew)
 George Summerbee, Gordon Summerbee (brother), Mike Summerbee (son), Nicky Summerbee (grandson of George/son of Mike)
 Mike Sutton, Chris Sutton (son), John Sutton (son)

T
 Paul Terry, John Terry (brother), Paul Konchesky (brother-in-law)
 Alan Thompson, Sean Longstaff (first cousin once removed), Matty Longstaff (first cousin once removed)
 Colin Todd, Andy Todd (son).
 Don Townsend,  Andy Townsend (son)

V
 Darius Vassell, Isaac Vassell (cousin)
 Stephen Vaughan Sr., Stephen Vaughan Jr. (son)

W
 Des Walker, Tyler Walker (son), Lewis Walker (son)
  Mike Walker, Ian Walker (son)
 Danny Wallace, Ray Wallace (brother), Rod Wallace (brother)
 Mark Walters,  Simon Ford (nephew)
 Dave Whelan, David Sharpe (grandson)
 George Wilkins, Graham Wilkins (son), Ray Wilkins (son), Stephen Wilkins (son), Dean Wilkins (son)
   Andy Wilson, Jimmy Wilson (son)
   Hughie Wilson, Jock Wilson (son)
 Dennis Wise, Henry Wise (son)
 Ian Wright (father), Shaun Wright-Phillips (adopted son), Bradley Wright-Phillips (son), D'Margio Wright-Phillips (grandson) Jermaine Wright (Ian's cousin), Drey Wright, Diaz Wright (both Jermaine's sons; Ian's nephews)
  Jocky Wright, Billy Wright (son), Doug Wright (son)

Y
 Ashley Young, Lewis Young (brother)

See also
List of Scottish football families

Notes

References

England
Lists of English sportspeople
Association football in England lists